Nebria alpicola is a species of ground beetle from Nebriinae subfamily that is endemic to Turkey.

References

Beetles described in 1865
Beetles of Asia
Endemic fauna of Turkey
alpicola